The 2019 Play In Challenger was a professional tennis tournament played on indoor hard courts. It was the second edition of the tournament which was part of the 2019 ATP Challenger Tour. It took place in Lille, France, between 18 and 24 March 2019.

Singles main-draw entrants

Seeds

 1 Rankings are as of 4 March 2019.

Other entrants
The following players received wildcards into the singles main draw:
  Geoffrey Blancaneaux
  Kenny de Schepper
  Evan Furness
  Rayane Roumane
  Johan Tatlot

The following players received entry into the singles main draw using their ITF World Tennis Ranking:
  Riccardo Bonadio
  Frederico Ferreira Silva
  Grégoire Jacq
  Roman Safiullin

The following players received entry from the qualifying draw:
  Aslan Karatsev
  Yannick Mertens

The following player received entry as a lucky loser:
  Andrés Artuñedo

Champions

Singles

 Grégoire Barrère def.  Yannick Maden 6–2, 4–6, 6–4.

Doubles

 Romain Arneodo /  Hugo Nys def.  Jonathan Erlich /  Fabrice Martin 7–5, 5–7, [10–8].

References

External links
Official Website

2019 ATP Challenger Tour
2019 in French tennis
March 2019 sports events in France